David Ostřížek (born October 1, 1990) is a Czech professional ice hockey player. He played with HC Oceláři Třinec in the Czech Extraliga during the 2010–11 Czech Extraliga season.

References

External links 

1990 births
Czech ice hockey forwards
HC Oceláři Třinec players
HC Kometa Brno players
HC Olomouc players
Living people
People from Frýdek-Místek
Sportspeople from the Moravian-Silesian Region